Voyage is the first EP by American metalcore band, In Fear and Faith. It was independently produced and released by the band themselves on December 18, 2007.

Background information
Voyage is the only release by In Fear and Faith to feature vocalist, Tyler Smith before his departure from the group within the following year. 2008 also marks the year that the band were signed to Rise Records after their attention caught onto Voyage. Its rhythmical melodies and harsh parts impressed the label. The two songs "Live Love Die" and "The Taste of Regret" were re-recorded for their debut full-length, Your World on Fire, which was released in 2009.

The EP was released on a rare independent pressing on CD, but was widely distributed on iTunes where it received over 30,000 song purchases by the end of 2008.

Track listing

Personnel
In Fear and Faith
Cody Anderson - screamed vocals
Tyler Smith - clean vocals
Tyler McElhaney - bass guitar, samples
Mehdi Niroomand - drums
Ramin Niroomand - lead guitar 
Micheal Guy - keyboards
Noah Slifka - rhythm guitar
Production
Produced by In Fear and Faith
Mixed and mastered by Dave Swanson
Engineered by Micky
Additional personnel by Geoff Rockwell 
Additional lyrics by Jarred DeArmas

References

2007 debut EPs
In Fear and Faith albums
Self-released EPs